Yane is a given name and may refer to:

 Yane Marques (born 1994), Brazilian modern pentathlete
 Yane Sandanski (1872–1915), Macedonian Bulgarian revolutionary
 Yane Yanev (born 1971), Bulgarian politician
 Yane Bugnard (born 1974), Swiss footballer